The 1979–80 FIBA European Cup Winners' Cup was the fourteenth edition of FIBA's 2nd-tier level European-wide professional club basketball competition, contested between national domestic cup champions, running from 30 October 1979, to 19 March 1980. It was contested by 22 teams, two more than in the previous edition.

Emerson Varese defeated the former champions, Gabetti Cantù, in a final held in Milan, winning the FIBA European Cup Winner's Cup for the second time.

Participants

First round

|}

*Sporting withdrew before the first leg alleging that six of their players had been selected to join the Portuguese national team in a US Tour, and Emerson Varese received a forfeit (2-0) in both games.

Second round

|}

Automatically qualified to the Quarter finals group stage
 Gabetti Cantù (title holder)
 Parker Leiden
 FC Barcelona

Quarterfinals

Semifinals

|}

Final
March 19, Palasport di San Siro, Milan

|}

References

External links 
FIBA European Cup Winner's Cup 1979–80 linguasport.com
FIBA European Cup Winner's Cup 1979–80

FIBA
FIBA Saporta Cup